Jamides virgulatus is a butterfly of the lycaenids or blues family. It is found on Borneo and Palawan.

Taxonomy
Seki et al. (1991), considered Jamides cunilda synonymous with J. virgulatus and this was followed by Eliot (1992). However, Hirowatari (1986) and (1992) retains J. cunilda for the taxa from Burma to Java and uses J. virgulatus in a strict sense for taxa from Borneo and Palawan.

References

 (1986). Butterflies of the Oriental Region Part III. pp. 536–672. Melbourne.
 (1895). A monograph of the Bornean Lycaenidae. Proceedings of the Zoological Society of London. 1895:556-627, 4 pls.
, 1915. Revision der Gattung Lampides auf Grand anatomischer Untersuchungen. Archiv für Naturgeschichte (A)61(6):1-46, I text-fig., 2 pls.
 (1992). A generic classification of the tribe Polyommatini of the Oriental and Australian regions (Lepidoptera, Lycaenidae, Polyommatinae). Bulletin of the University of Osaka Prefecture, Series B, Vol. 44, Suppl.
 (1991). Butterflies of Borneo Vol. 2, No. 1. Lycaenidae. Tobishima Corporation, Tokyo.
 (1987). Kontyû to Shizen (Nature & Insects). 23(4):38-40, 5 pls.

Butterflies described in 1895
Jamides
Butterflies of Borneo